Punctuated Equilibrium is the first solo album by American singer/guitarist Scott "Wino" Weinrich, released in January 2009 via Southern Lord.

Track listing 
 "Release Me" 5:52
 "Punctuated Equilibrium" 2:46
 "The Woman in the Orange Pants" 3:25
 "Smilin Road" 5:09
 "Eyes of the Flesh" 4:12
 "Wild Blue Yonder" 6:25
 "Secret Realm Devotion" 4:50
 "Water Crane" 1:57
 "Gods, Frauds, Neo-Cons and Demagogues" 3:12
 "Silver Lining" 4:31

Bonus 10" vinyl tracks
 "Chest Fever"
 "Der Gift (The Poison)"
 "The Comet and the Moon"
 "On the (Sacrificial) Lam"

Personnel 
 Scott "Wino" Weinrich – vocals, guitar
 Steve Fisher – additional guitars
 J. Robbins – keyboards
 Jon Blank – bass guitar
 Jean-Paul Gaster  – drums, percussion

Production
 Produced by Wino and J. Robbins
 Engineered by J. Robbins
 Mastered by Bob Weston

References

External links 
 Southern Lord album profile

Scott Weinrich albums
2009 albums